was a Japanese judoka.

Takagi is from Shirahama, Chiba and began judo when he was in junior high school.

Takagi began working for the Tokyo Metropolitan Police Department after graduation from Nihon University in 1971. He participated in the World Championship twice and won a gold medal in 1973 and a bronze medal in 1975.

As of 2011, Takagi coached judo at his alma mater, Nihon University. Among his students are Jun Konno, Michiaki Kamochi, Makoto Takimoto and others. He died of a heart attack at the age of 68 on 6 December 2016.

Achievements
1970 – All-Japan Weight Class Championships (Heavyweight) 1st
1972 – All-Japan Weight Class Championships (Heavyweight) 2nd
1973 - World Championships (Heavyweight) 1st
 - All-Japan Championships (Openweight only) 2nd
1975 - World Championships (Heavyweight) 3rd
 - All-Japan Championships (Openweight only) 2nd
1976 - All-Japan Championships (Openweight only) 3rd
1977 - All-Japan Championships (Openweight only) 3rd
1978 – Jigoro Kano Cup (Heavyweight) 3rd
 - All-Japan Championships (Openweight only) 2nd
1980 –All-Japan Weight Class Championships (Heavyweight) 3rd

References

External links
 

1948 births
2016 deaths
Japanese male judoka
Sportspeople from Chiba Prefecture